Meu Pé de Laranja Lima (My Sweet Orange Tree) is a 1998 Brazilian telenovela, based on the novel of the same name.

Cast and characters

References

External links 
 
 

Rede Bandeirantes telenovelas
1998 telenovelas
1998 Brazilian television series debuts
1999 Brazilian television series endings
Brazilian telenovelas
Children's telenovelas
Portuguese-language telenovelas